Vatica umbonata is a species of plant in the family Dipterocarpaceae.

It is a tree found in Peninsular Malaysia, Borneo, the Philippines, and Thailand.

References

umbonata
Trees of Peninsular Malaysia
Trees of Borneo
Trees of the Philippines
Flora of Palawan
Trees of Thailand
Least concern plants
Taxonomy articles created by Polbot